Boris Vallée (born 3 June 1993 in Verviers) is a Belgian cyclist, who currently rides for UCI ProTeam .

Major results

2011
 1st Omloop der Vlaamse Gewesten
 3rd Time trial, National Junior Road Championships
2012
 5th Nationale Sluitingsprijs
2013
 1st Prologue Carpathian Couriers Race
 1st Grand Prix Criquielion
 4th Nationale Sluitingsprijs
 8th Road race, Jeux de la Francophonie
2015
 2nd Grand Prix de Denain
 6th Overall Tour de Wallonie
 6th Münsterland Giro
 7th Kampioenschap van Vlaanderen
 9th Ronde van Zeeland Seaports
2016
 Tour de Bretagne
1st Stages 2 & 5
 1st Stage 2 Tour de Wallonie
 1st Stage 3 Ronde de l'Oise
 4th Grote Prijs Jef Scherens
2017
 4th Grand Prix de Denain
 6th Grote Prijs Stad Zottegem
2018
 1st  Overall Tour of Taihu Lake
 8th Grand Prix Criquielion
2019
 2nd Overall Tour of Taihu Lake
 5th Halle–Ingooigem
 7th Grand Prix d'Isbergues
 9th Trofeo Palma
2020
 6th Grote Prijs Jean-Pierre Monseré

References

External links

1993 births
Living people
Belgian male cyclists
Cyclists at the 2010 Summer Youth Olympics
People from Verviers
Cyclists from Liège Province
21st-century Belgian people